The Foreign relations of Egypt are the Egyptian government's external relations with the outside world. Egypt's foreign policy operates along a non-aligned level. Factors such as population size, historical events, military strength, diplomatic expertise and a strategic geographical position give Egypt extensive political influence in the Middle East, Africa, and within the Non-Aligned Movement as a whole. Cairo has been a crossroads of the Arab world's commerce and culture for centuries, and its intellectual and religious institutions are at the center of the region's social and cultural landmarks.

Bilateral relations

Israeli–Palestinian conflict
Egypt has been seeking to play a role in the resolution of the Israeli–Palestinian conflict.

Egypt played an important role in the negotiations leading to the Madrid Conference of 1991, which, under United States and Soviet sponsorship, brought together all parties in the region, including for the first time a Palestinian delegation, to discuss Middle East peace.

This support has continued to the present, with former President Hosni Mubarak often intervening personally to promote peace negotiations. In 1996, he hosted the Sharm El-Sheikh "Summit of the Peacemakers" attended by President Bill Clinton and other world leaders.

In 2000, he hosted two summits at Sharm El-Sheikh and one at Taba in an effort to resume the Camp David negotiations suspended in July 2000, and in June 2003, Mubarak hosted President George W. Bush for another summit on Middle East peace process. Another summit was convened in Sharm El Sheik in early 2005, which was attended by Egypt, Israel, the Palestinian Authority and Jordan. The former Egyptian Chief of Intelligence, General Omar Suleiman, played a substantial role in negotiations between the Israeli and Palestinian sides and was highly respected on both sides.

Africa
In the 21st-century Egypt has encountered a major problem with immigration, as millions of Africans attempt to enter Egypt fleeing poverty and war.  Border control methods can be "harsh, sometimes lethal." This has strained relations with Egypt's southern neighbors, and with Israel and the members of the EU as these immigrants attempt to move on to wealthier countries.

The dispute between Egypt and Ethiopia over the Grand Ethiopian Renaissance Dam has become a national preoccupation in both countries. Egypt sees the dam as an existential threat, fearing that the dam will reduce the amount of water it receives from the Nile. Egypt's Foreign Minister Sameh Shoukry said: "Survival is not a question of choice, but an imperative of nature."

Americas

Asia

Europe
European Union relations with Egypt are based on a partnership relation within the Euro – Mediterranean and Middle East area, which is of vital strategic importance and a key external relations priority for the EU.

The Euro-Mediterranean Partnership launched at the 1995 Barcelona Conference between the European Union and its originally 12 Mediterranean Partners: Algeria, Cyprus, Egypt, Israel, Jordan, Lebanon, Malta, Morocco, Syria, Tunisia, Turkey, and the Palestinian Authority. Libya currently has observer status at certain meetings. Since the enlargement, in May 2004 and January 2007, the co-operation and needs covers 35 countries, the EU of 27, including Cyprus and Malta and the 10 Mediterranean Partners.

Egypt has also taken an active role regarding Euro-Mediterranean Partnership, such as its participation in the technical meeting of which it was the speaker for the Arab group. Additionally, the first meeting of the Euro-Mediterranean Parliamentary assembly was co-chaired by an Egyptian.

Egypt has been one of the leading recipients among the Mediterranean partners in terms of total funds received from the MEDA programme, the principal financial instrument of the European Union for the implementation of the Euro-Mediterranean Partnership. It is focused on policy-led, national structural reform and liberalisation programmes with a sector-wide approach.

The EU is Egypt's biggest trading partner currently accounting for 42% of Egyptian exports and 37% of imports, with the balance of trade still in the EU's favour. Trade between the EU and Egypt has risen by more than 5% in the last five years to reach around 11.6 billion euro in 2004. Egypt's main exports to the EU in 2004 were energy (39%), textiles and clothing (15%), agricultural products (9%), and chemicals (5%). Major imports from the EU were power generating machinery (21%), chemicals (16%), transport equipment (16%), and food and agricultural products (10%). Egypt has a serious but improving trade deficit that has put considerable pressure on the Egyptian pound.

Trade relations with the EU are good although there are several outstanding trade and phyto-sanitary issues. These range from specific market access issues and difficulties for businesses facing a highly regulated and complex system through to restrictions in the export of agricultural goods (potatoes) and fishery products because they do not conform with EU quality norms.

Egypt is included in the European Union's European Neighbourhood Policy (ENP) which aims at bringing the EU and its neighbours closer.

Some time after the starting of the Arab Spring, in March 2011 the European Union adopted the joint declaration ‘ A partnership for democracy and shared prosperity with the Southern Mediterranean', aimed at making a number of initiatives in the field of civic society support, financial assistance and further access to the EU market dependent upon advancement in the democratization process.

As far as Egypt was concerned this declaration envisioned the further deepening of the previous Free Trade Agreement stipulated in 2004, geared towards the inclusion of areas such as trade in services, government procurement, competition, intellectual property rights, and investment protection. To the 2011 declaration, a preliminary phase of the negotiations followed in June 2013, when the EU and Egypt began an exploratory dialogue on how to deepen trade and investment relations, in particular through the possible negotiation of a Deep and Comprehensive Free Trade Agreement (DCFTA).

In August 2014, the European Union discussed the possibility of revising provision of aid to Egypt.  However, divisions over the appropriate stance to adopt among European diplomats persisted, coupled by the fear that the vacuum might be soon filled by other actors, following a Saudi Foreign Minister's declaration that the Kingdom was ready to step in and those of Prime Minister Hazem al Beblawi about the possibility to appeal to Russia for foreign aid.  Therefore, the only measure upon which the Foreign Ministers agreed was to suspend the sale of arms and materials that could be used for repression, but fell short to halt aid program which could damage civil society.

Earlier in July 2013, EU High Representative Catherine Ashton had visited Egypt in an attempt to promote reconciliation among the parties involved. She is credited for being the only foreign diplomat to get access to deposed president Mohamed Morsi.
In an official statement released at the end of a following visit held in April 2014, the Representative raised the issue of the death penalties and incarceration of journalists and activists. At the same time, her later declarations about el-Sisi's bid for presidential candidacy as “difficult” but “brave” sparked harsh criticism among supporters of the Muslim Brotherhood, who claimed the Representative, who advanced logistical reasons, did not make any efforts to get in touch with them and members of their Anti-Coup Alliance.

In April 2014, the European Union agreed to conduct electoral monitoring, for the first time, in occasion of the Presidential elections scheduled for 26/27 May 2014. Other organizations declined to join, as in their opinion this would legitimize what they called an unlawful take on power.

A contract for the sale of 30 Rafale fighter jets was signed between the defense ministries of Egypt and France in May 2021. The official value of the contract was not disclosed at first and was later exposed to be worth 3.75 billion euro or $4.5 billion, by an investigative website called Disclose. In December 2020, French President Emmanuel Macron received criticism for not controlling the sale of weapons to Egypt on its poor human rights record, stating counter-terrorism concerns. The Egyptian defense ministry cited that the deal would be supported via a 10-year loan without disclosing its value or any further details. Rights organizations have denounced the deal and accused the French president of overlooking the increasing violation of freedom in Egypt under the regime of President Abdel Fattah Al-Sisi. France's armed forces, finance, and foreign ministries were unavailable for comment. However, French officials claim that Paris, under one of its policies, is avoiding criticism of countries on their human rights records to work with them effectively in private.

On 3 February 2022, around 175 Members of European Parliament wrote a joint letter to foreign ministers and ambassadors to the UN Human Rights Council and requested them to secure the establishment of a UN human rights monitoring and reporting mechanism on Egypt. The MEPs were concerned that despite devastating human rights crisis in Egypt, the international communities persistently failed to take any meaningful action to address the situation. The Egyptian authorities, under President Abdel Fattah Al-Sisi, have “brutally and systematically” repressed all forms of dissent and severely curtailed civic space.

Oceania

International involvement
Egypt played a key role during the 1990-91 Persian Gulf crisis. President Mubarak helped assemble the international coalition and deployed 35,000 Egyptian troops against Iraq to liberate Kuwait. The Egyptian contingent was one of the largest in the coalition forces, along with the U.S., U.K. and Saudi Arabia.

In the aftermath of the Gulf War, Egypt signed the Damascus Declaration with Syria and the Persian Gulf states to strengthen Persian Gulf security. Egypt continues to contribute regularly to United Nations peacekeeping missions, most recently in East Timor, Sierra Leone, and Liberia.

Following the September 11, 2001 terrorist attacks on the United States, Egypt, which has itself been the target of terrorist attacks, has been a key supporter of the U.S. war against terrorists and terrorist organizations such as Osama bin Laden and al-Qaeda, and has supported the Iraqi Governing Council.

On December 25, 2006, the Egyptian Foreign Minister Ahmed Abul Gheit called for end to "nuclear double standards" where sanctions are imposed on Iran for enriching uranium, but the Israeli nuclear program is not subject to any control by the International Atomic Energy Agency.

Egypt is member of ABEDA, ACC, ACCT (associate), AfDB, AFESD, AL, AMF, AU, BSEC (observer), CAEU, CTBT, EBRD, ECA, ESCWA, FAO, G-15, G-19, G-24, G-77, IAEA, IBRD, ICAO, ICC, ICRM, IDA, IDB, IFAD, IFC, IFRCS, IHO, ILO, IMF, IMO, Inmarsat, Intelsat, Interpol, IOC, IOM, ISO, ITU, MINURSO, MONUC, NAM, OAPEC, OAS(observer), OAU, OIC, OSCE (partner), PCA, UN, UNAMSIL, UNCTAD, UNESCO, UNIDO, UNITAR, UNMIBH, UNMIK, UNMOP, UNOMIG, UNRWA, UNTAET, UPU, WCO, EFTU, WHO, WIPO, WMO, WToO, and WTrO. Egypt is one of only seven U.N. members which is not a member of the Organisation for the Prohibition of Chemical Weapons.

See also
 List of Foreign ministers of Egypt
 Iran-Arab Relations (Egypt)
 List of Ambassadors from Egypt
 List of diplomatic missions in Egypt
 List of diplomatic missions of Egypt
 Ministry of Foreign Affairs
 Visa requirements for Egyptian citizens

References

External links
 History of Egypt - U.S. relations
  Assessing the United States-Egyptian Military and Security Relations
 The Future of American-Egyptian relations
Deniers of Egypt's dark past An article exploring Egypt's Africanness
Embassy of the Arab Republic of Egypt in London The official website of the Egyptian Embassy in London
 EU Neighbourhood Info Centre: Egypt